Steven A. Frank (born 1957) is a professor of biology at the University of California, Irvine.  His areas of expertise are evolutionary genetics, host-parasite interactions and social evolution.  He earned a Ph.D. from the University of Michigan in 1987.

Frank was awarded a Guggenheim Fellowship in 1995, and received prizes from the Society for the Study of Evolution in 1988 and the American Society of Naturalists in 1986.

Bibliography 
Foundations of Social Evolution.  Princeton University Press, 1998.
Immunology and Evolution of Infectious Disease.  Princeton University Press, 2002.
Dynamics of Cancer: Incidence, Inheritance, and Evolution.  Princeton University Press, 2007.

References

External links 
 University website
 Personal website
  Review of Foundations of Social Evolution, Heredity, March 1999.

Living people
1957 births
University of Michigan alumni
University of California, Irvine faculty
Evolutionary biologists
Fellows of the American Academy of Arts and Sciences